Eugénio Lopes (born 22 January 1929) is a Portuguese athlete. He competed in the men's triple jump at the 1952 Summer Olympics.

References

External links
 

1929 births
Possibly living people
Athletes (track and field) at the 1952 Summer Olympics
Portuguese male triple jumpers
Olympic athletes of Portugal